Sky and Space Global (UK) Ltd is a British public company planning a constellation of 200 nanosatellites in equatorial Low Earth orbit for narrowband communications that it expects will cost $160 million or less to complete in total. Satellites will feature inter-satellite links and the capability to autonomously monitor and manage satellite health and the in-orbit communications network. The company has branches in the United Kingdom, Israel and Australia.

History 
After its incorporation in November 2015 Sky and Space Global (UK) Ltd performed a reverse merger with Burleson Energy Limited enabling a backdoor listing on the ASX and successfully completing an IPO worth $4.5 million on 31 May 2016.

On 30 August 2016 Sky and Space Global signed a service contract with its first wholesale customer, Sat-Space Africa, covering the provision of bandwidth from the three demonstration satellites ("Three Diamonds") to be launched in May 2017. Sat-Space Africa forecasts revenues from using only a minor portion of bandwidth capacity provided by the three demonstration satellites of approximately $500,000 per annum, with the potential grow up to $2 million with the full equatorial constellation in operation.

On 13 September 2016 Sky and Space Global announced a binding agreement with Virgin Galactic to secure four dedicated launch missions on the LauncherOne system from 2018 with each launch carrying multiple nanosatellites.

Through a second public offering in November 2016, which was significantly oversubscribed, Sky and Space Global raised another $7 million.

In March 2017 Sky and Space Global announced a non-binding MoU with Globalsat Group for testing and offering their satellite service in Latin America.

On 7 April 2020 an announcement was published to the ASX announcing that Sky and Space Global had entered into voluntary administration the previous day.

On 30th August 2021 Sky and Space Global was delisted by the Australian Stock Exchange as they could not meet the ongoing requirements of a good corporate citizen and also failed to pay their annual listing fees.

Satellites 
Sky and Space Global satellites conform to the CubeSat standard (3U per satellite) and are built at an estimated cost of around $500,000 per unit which does not include launch costs in the range of $200,000 to $250,000 per satellite. The satellites are placed in low Earth orbit at an altitude of 500–800 km. The satellites will have a design life of five to seven years. After four years the intention is to drop them back to Earth to dispose of them. Sky and Space Global intends to replace 25 percent of the constellation each year, replacing 50 satellites with new versions. Satellites will come with a propulsion system that is non-toxic and non-hazardous in terms of explosiveness.

The first three demonstration satellites called Blue, Green and Red Diamond, or together referred to as the "Three Diamonds", were built by GomSpace and will be launched by the ISRO's PSLV-XL. They will immediately provide commercial services to Sat-Space Africa and BeepTool LLC.

The initial constellation of 200 satellites will be built by GomSpace as well and launched into five orbital planes, one in equatorial and four in inclined near-equatorial orbits. Service coverage will span from 15 degrees south latitude to 15 degrees north of the equator. Virgin Galactic has the contract to launch subsequent satellites. The company plans to provide communications services to Virgin Galactic's Cosmic Girl which will act as launch platform for smallsat orbital launch vehicle LauncherOne.

As of December 2019, the company lowered the number of satellites planned to be launched due to funding issues, planning to launch only 8 satellites by the end of 2020.

Satellite list

Frequency bands 
Sky and Space Global's constellation is planned to use spectrum in the S band and L band for mobile communication coverage, S band for inter-satellite links and again S band and UHF for mission control. On 27 September 2016 the company announced that it has received approval from the United Kingdom's Ministry of Defence to use its UHF frequencies for command and telemetry of the three demonstration satellites until the end of 2019 with the possibility to extend this timeframe.

User terminals 
On 20 September 2016 Flextronics Israel Ltd signed a memorandum of understanding for the design, development and production of end user devices for Sky and Space Global's narrowband communication system.

In January 2017 Ayecka Communications Systems has been contracted to build prototype hotspots, which will allow any mobile device, including tablets, to connect to the SAS satellite network using WiFi.

The companies intend to explore the integration of an SAS app in SocialEco's smartphone and the development of a dedicated Android smartphone that will cost $20 and have the capability to directly connect to SAS's satellite network.

References

External links 
 

Space industry companies
Aerospace companies of England
British companies established in 2015